Catigbian, officially the Municipality of Catigbian,  is a 4th class municipality in the province of Bohol, Philippines. According to the 2020 census, it has a population of 23,805 people.

Catigbian was formerly known as San Jacinto, and officially changed to its current name in 1954. Catigbian is named after a certain group of seed-bearing plants named "Katigbi" (Coix lacrymajobi), which grow abundantly.

History

The town was founded in 1829 as one of the villages where rebels were resettled after the Dagohoy Rebellion had been suppressed. In 1903, when the province was reorganized, it was annexed to Balilihan but was made an independent municipality once more on 17 June 1949. At that time there were only 15 barrios within the territorial limits compared to the 22 barangays it has now.

Geography

Barangays

Catigbian comprises 22 barangays:

Climate

Demographics

Economy

Commerce and industry

 Catigbian Public Market
 Livestock Auction Center – the biggest in the province of Bohol
 Abattoir
 Catigbian Waterworks System
 One Town One Product (OTOP) Display Center

Agriculture

  alienable & disposable land
 43.85% devoted to crops
 56.15% pasture land, grassland, idle land
  forestal land
 Livestock raising (alternative)

Infrastructure

Water

 3 Pumping Stations for 12 barangays –  /day
 2 more barangays with own pumping station

Facilities
 Catigbian Training Center
 Municipal Court Hall
 Municipal Conference Hall
 Public Market
 Tennis Court
 Basketball Court/Multi-Purpose Court (sports and other activities)
 Catigbian District Hospital
 Municipal Health Center

Feast Days & Patron Saints

Catigbian comprises two parishes:
 Immaculate Conception Parish (church located in Poblacion West), which celebrates its Feast Day on 8 December in honor of the Immaculate conception of the Virgin Mary
 Santo Niño Parish (church located in Baang), which celebrates its feast day on the third Saturday of January in honor of the Holy Child Jesus

Tourism

Catigbian is home to caves, hanging bridges, handicrafts, livestock market and for its nature resort. Among its attractions are

The Katigbawan Festival

What distinguishes Catigbian from other towns is its annual festival, the Katigbawan, which is a week-long festival in June consisting of various activities like carabao-racing, hog-catching, agrofair, motorcross and a search for Miss Katigbawan.

This four-day event has several activities lined up starting with the opening of the festival with a parade after a holy mass. It is followed by a comparza and a talent contest of Miss Katigbawan candidates during the day. Judging of the display of agrofair, bloodletting and motorcross takes place on the second day. On the third day is the Carabao Parade with carabao-racing and hog-catching at central elementary school and the search for Catigbian's prettiest – the Miss Katigbawan Beauty Pageant – in the evening.  On the fourth day is the street dancing, then a fireworks display to cap the festival.

Education

Literacy Rate: 87.9%
 1 Tertiary School
Bohol Northwestern Colleges

19 Public Elementary Schools
 3 Primary Schools
22 Day Care Centers

See also

List of renamed cities and municipalities in the Philippines

Notes

References

External links

 [ Philippine Standard Geographic Code]
Municipality of Catigbian
Provincial Government of Bohol

Municipalities of Bohol